Andre Payette (29 July 1976 – 28 September 2022) was a Canadian professional ice hockey left winger.

Payette was drafted in 1994 by the NHL Philadelphia Flyers, and won a Calder Cup with their American Hockey League affiliate, the Philadelphia Phantoms.

Payette signed for the Manchester Phoenix of the English Premier Ice Hockey League in the summer of 2009, following the organisation's move into the EPL from the EIHL.  Payette is known for his physical play and amassed more than 3,000 minutes in the penalty box during his time in the United Kingdom.

On 23 November 2010, it was announced that Payette had signed to play for Sheffield Steeldogs of the English Premier Ice Hockey League.

Payette was released from his contract as Head Coach of the Sheffield Steeldogs in 2015, and replaced by Dominic Osman, who the club had signed from Hull Stingrays of the Elite Ice Hockey League. He later signed for the Whitley Warriors and played two seasons in the north east.

Career statistics

References

External links
 

1976 births
2022 deaths
Canadian expatriate ice hockey players in England
Canadian ice hockey left wingers
Coventry Blaze players
Franco-Ontarian people
Houston Aeros (1994–2013) players
Ice hockey people from Ontario
Kingston Frontenacs players
Lowell Lock Monsters players
Manchester Monarchs (AHL) players
Manchester Phoenix players
Manitoba Moose players
Mohawk Valley Prowlers players
Newcastle Vipers players
Philadelphia Flyers draft picks
Philadelphia Phantoms players
Rochester Americans players
Sault Ste. Marie Greyhounds players
St. John's Maple Leafs players
Toledo Storm players
Ice hockey player-coaches
Whitley Warriors players
Sportspeople from Cornwall, Ontario